She's Having a Baby is a 1988 American romantic comedy film directed and written by John Hughes and starring Kevin Bacon and Elizabeth McGovern. It tells the story of a young newlywed couple who try to cope with married life and their parents' expectations.

The film was met with mixed reviews.

Plot
This film looks at the lives of Jefferson "Jake" (Kevin Bacon) and Kristy Briggs (Elizabeth McGovern), from their wedding day until the birth of their first child, mostly through Jake's eyes, with his voiceover commentaries and several imaginary scenes.

Before their wedding day, Jake asks his best friend Davis McDonald (Alec Baldwin) if he thinks Jake will be happy to which Davis says "Yeah, you'll be happy. You just won't know it."

After their wedding that was attended by Jake's parents Jim (James Ray) and Sarah (Holland Taylor), his grandparents (Bill Erwin and Reba McKinney), and Kristy's parents Russ (William Windom) and Gayle (Cathryn Damon), Jake and Kristy head off for New Mexico where Jake works toward gaining a Master's Degree, but leaves before finishing. They return to Chicago where Jake is hired as an advertising copywriter. Jake says he wants to be a writer, which amuses his boss Howard (Paul Gleason). Kristy is hired as a research analyst and they are able to buy a house in the suburbs. Meanwhile, Jake begins fantasizing about having an affair with a mysterious young French model (Isabel García Lorca).

Jake and Kristy continue to adjust to their new lives, although Jake feels pressure from his parents, society, and his wife to have a child. Gayle (Cathryn Damon) casually informs them that she had a difficult birth with Kristy and nearly died. Later, Kristy informs Jake that she stopped taking contraceptives without telling him. After several months, they discover that the reason she hasn't gotten pregnant is because he has been unable to impregnate her.

After not seeing Jake and Kristy for three years, Davis visits unexpectedly telling them that his father has died. Jake and Kristy are supportive, allowing him to stay the night. Things take a turn when Davis makes a pass at Kristy by proclaiming his feelings and trying to open her bathrobe, but Kristy turns him down telling him that she is in love with Jake.

The couple begins a fertility program, which eventually succeeds. During a traumatic labor, Jake must leave the delivery room and he worries about losing Kristy, realizing that his lack of satisfaction in life was due to his own selfishness and immaturity.

The last scene of the film reveals that Jake's voiceover was the new father reading his novel entitled She's Having a Baby to his wife and son.

During the credits, Jake and Kristy talk about what to name their son as a montage of family members, people they know, Roman Craig, Chet Ripley, and Buck Ripley from the following film The Great Outdoors, Ferris Bueller from Ferris Bueller's Day Off, and an assortment of different actors pitching their suggestions of boy names is shown before settling on the name Christopher.

Cast
 Kevin Bacon as Jefferson "Jake" Edward Briggs, an advertising copywriter.
 Neal Bacon as young Jake
 Elizabeth McGovern as Kristen "Kristy" Bainbridge Briggs, a research analyzer and Jake's childhood sweetheart who marries Jake.
 Laure Aronica as young Kristy
 Alec Baldwin as Davis McDonald, Jake's friend.
 James Ray as Jim Briggs, Jake's father.
 Holland Taylor as Sarah Briggs, Jake's mother.
 William Windom as Russell "Russ" Bainbridge, Kristy's father.
 Cathryn Damon as Gayle Bainbridge, Kristy's mother.
 Bill Erwin as Grandpa Briggs, Jake's grandfather.
 Reba McKinney as Grandma Briggs, Jake's grandmother.
 John Ashton as Ken
 Paul Gleason as Howard, a man who hires Jake to work as an advertisement copywriter.
 Dennis Dugan as Bill, the business partner of Howard.
 Larry Hankin as Hank
 Edie McClurg as Lynn
 Nancy Lenehan as Cynthia
 Valerie Breiman as Erin
 Isabel García Lorca as Fantasy Girl
 Lili Taylor as Girl in Medical Lab
 Gail O'Grady as Laura

Besides some of the characters mentioned above, the following appear in the end credits pitching their ideas of boy names for Jake and Kristy's son where they are all uncredited:

 Kirstie Alley
 Harry Anderson
 Dan Aykroyd as Roman Craig from The Great Outdoors
 Matthew Broderick as Ferris Bueller from Ferris Bueller's Day Off
 John Candy as Chet Ripley from The Great Outdoors
 Dyan Cannon
 Belinda Carlisle
 Stewart Copeland
 Ted Danson 
 Judi Evans
 Bob Fraser 
 Woody Harrelson
 Robert Hays
 Amy Irving
 Magic Johnson
 Michael Keaton
 Joanna Kerns
 Elias Koteas
 Penny Marshall
 Bill Murray
 Olivia Newton-John
 Roy Orbison
 Cindy Pickett
 Bronson Pinchot
 Annie Potts
 John Ratzenberger
 Ally Sheedy
 Lyman Ward
 Wil Wheaton
 Chris Young as Buck Ripley from The Great Outdoors
 Warren Zevon

Production
The film was shot in Winnetka, Illinois, and Evanston, Illinois, from September 1986 to December 1986. However, several scenes were shot directly in the Field Museum in Chicago, Illinois. Most of John Hughes's films either take place in Chicago or the suburbs of Chicago, or are about people going to or coming from Chicago.

Cathryn Damon died of ovarian cancer before the film's release and thus appeared posthumously.

Soundtrack

The She's Having a Baby soundtrack album was released in 1988 on I.R.S. Records label and produced by Dave Wakeling.

The song during the birth sequence is "This Woman's Work" by Kate Bush and is featured on her 1989 album The Sensual World. John Hughes is thanked in the album's liner notes.

The song playing during the trailer is "Music for a Found Harmonium" by the Penguin Cafe Orchestra.
The song played during the street party is "How Sweet It Is (To Be Loved by You)" by Marvin Gaye.

Music video
In the video for Dave Wakeling's title tune, he performs alongside a female backup singer; behind them, a huge screen displays various clips from the movie. All of this is alternated with footage of Wakeling as he shops at a music store for guitars.

 Track listing
 "She's Having a Baby" – Dave Wakeling
 "Haunted When the Minutes Drag" – Love and Rockets
 "Desire (Come and Get It)" – Gene Loves Jezebel
 "Happy Families" – XTC
 "Crazy Love" – Bryan Ferry
 "You Just Haven't Earned It Yet, Baby" – Kirsty MacColl
 "Apron Strings" – Everything but the Girl
 "This Woman's Work" – Kate Bush
 "It's All in the Game" – Carmel
 "Full of Love" – Dr. Calculus

Reception
The film received mixed reviews from critics and has 41% positive reviews on Rotten Tomatoes based on 44 reviews. The site's consensus states: "Kevin Bacon and Elizabeth McGovern struggle to sustain a spark in She's Having a Baby, a blase adult romance that lacks the specificity and style of writer-director John Hughes' more successful forays into teenage angst." Roger Ebert of the Chicago Sun-Times gave She's Having a Baby a mixed 2 stars out of 4. He wrote that the film "begins with the simplest and most moving of stories and interrupts it with an amazing assortment of gimmicks," being salvaged only by strong performances from Bacon and McGovern.

In An Evening with Kevin Smith 2: Evening Harder director Kevin Smith cites She's Having a Baby as his favorite John Hughes film. He also cites it as a template for Jersey Girl, joking that both films were financially unsuccessful.

References

External links

 
 

1988 romantic comedy films
1988 films
American romantic comedy films
Films scored by Stewart Copeland
Films directed by John Hughes (filmmaker)
Films produced by John Hughes (filmmaker)
Films shot in Chicago
Paramount Pictures films
American pregnancy films
Films with screenplays by John Hughes (filmmaker)
1980s pregnancy films
1980s English-language films
1980s American films